Rashid Yakhyayevich Gaysanov (born 17 September 1972), last name also spelled Gaisanov, is a Russian politician in the southern Republic of Ingushetia. He has served as the prime minister of Ingushetia under Ingush President Yunus-bek Yevkurov. He was further appointed the acting president of Ingushetia following an assassination attempt against Yevkurov in June 2009.

The Russian government of Dmitry Medvedev appointed Gaysanov as the acting president of Ingushetia by presidential decree following the assassination attempt against President Yunus-bek Yevkurov in June 2009. The bombing left Yevkurov in a coma for two weeks after the bombing and unable to govern.

Gaysanov's appointment as acting president was seen as an attempt by the Kremlin to halt potential political infighting. Both Gaysanov and former Ingush president Ruslan Aushev had reportedly shown interest in becoming acting president until Yevkurov returned to office.  Gaysanov was directed by the President of Russia, Dmitry Medvedev, to exercise operational leadership of the republic in view of the powers that Gaysanov has to assume that role.

Gaysanov pledged to continue all of Yevkurov's programs and policies during Yevkurov's recovery, "All the programs and projects led by President Yevkurov and launched by him, will be continued."

Rashid Gaysanov was the acting President of Ingushetia.

References

1972 births
Heads of Ingushetia
Ingush people
Living people
People from Nazranovsky District
Acting heads of the federal subjects of Russia
Rostov State University of Economics alumni